The World Group was the highest level of Davis Cup competition in 1995. The first-round losers went into the Davis Cup World Group Qualifying Round, and the winners progressed to the quarterfinals and were guaranteed a World Group spot for 1996.

Sweden were the defending champions, but were eliminated in the semifinals.

The United States won the title, defeating Russia in the final, 3–2. The final was held at the Olympic Stadium in Moscow, Russia, from 1 to 3 December. It was the US team's 31st Davis Cup title overall.

Participating teams

Draw

First round

United States vs. France

Italy vs. Czech Republic

Denmark vs. Sweden

Austria vs. Spain

South Africa vs. Australia

Belgium vs. Russia

Switzerland vs. Netherlands

Germany vs. Croatia

Quarterfinals

Italy vs. United States

Sweden vs. Austria

Russia vs. South Africa

Netherlands vs. Germany

Semifinals

United States vs. Sweden

Russia vs. Germany

Final

Russia vs. United States

References

External links
Davis Cup official website

World Group
Davis Cup World Group
Davis Cup